Gerald "Gerry" McCarthy (born 2 November 1951) is a former Australian rules footballer who played with Hawthorn and Fitzroy in the Victorian Football League (VFL).

McCarthy, recruited from Ashburton YCW, played most of his football as a defender. He appeared in five finals for Hawthorn, but never got to play in a grand final, missing out on selection in both 1975 and 1976.

He was traded to Fitzroy at the end of the 1977 VFL season, in exchange for Terry Wallace, who was residential bound to Fitzroy but hadn't played any VFL football for them.

References

1951 births
Australian rules footballers from Victoria (Australia)
Hawthorn Football Club players
Fitzroy Football Club players
Living people